Dubi is a village in now newly formed Bajali district, Assam State, India. It is situated on the north bank of  the Brahmaputra River. It is about three miles from the Pathshala railway station on the N. F. Railway.

Transport
The village is accessible through National Highway 31 and connected to nearby towns and cities with regular buses and other modes of transportation.

See also
 Titkuri	
 Tukrapara

References

Villages in Barpeta district